Guerrero Negro Airport  is an airport located 6 km north of Guerrero Negro in neighboring Ensenada Municipality of southern Baja California state, Mexico.

It handles air traffic for the City of Guerrero Negro, located in Mulegé Municipality of northern Baja California Sur state.

Airlines and destinations

Accidents and incidents
On 20 December 1997, Douglas C-47 XA-CUC of Aerolíneas California Pacífico crashed near Guerrero Negro on a flight from Guerrero Negro Airport to Isla de Cedros Airport, Cedros, Baja California.

References

External links
 Fallingrain.com: MMGR—Guerrero Negro Airport
 MMGR at Elite Jets
 MMGR photo at Our Airports
 MMGR at World Aero Data

Airports in Baja California
Airports in Baja California Sur
Mulegé Municipality
Transport in Ensenada Municipality